Alto de São João Cemetery (Portuguese: Cemitério do Alto de São João) is the largest cemetery in Lisbon, Portugal, located in the freguesia (civil parish) of Penha de França, in eastern Lisbon (formerly, within the parish of São João).

Similar to Prazeres Cemetery, it is the resting place for many prominent figures, from literature to the arts, from science to politics, from working class to nobility, side by side with anonymous citizens who are buried and cremated there. The cemetery is public and receives residents from several freguesias in the capital.

The cemetery is composed of mausoleums, temporary and perpetual graves, crypts, ossuaries and columbaria. Also noteworthy are the Crypt of Combatants of the Great War and the Memorial of the Tarrafal concentration camp victims.

History 
Alto de São João Cemetery was founded in 1833 after the outbreak of cholera in the city, along with Prazeres Cemetery. It was originally named Cemitério Oriental de Lisboa (Eastern Cemetery of Lisbon).

The country's first crematorium was built here in 1925, but would eventually cease to operate for political and religious reasons in 1936. It only resumed operation in 1985 after pressure from the city's Hindu community. There have already been cremated several public figures such as José Saramago, Nobel Literature laureate and Álvaro Cunhal, anti-fascist politician and minister in the first four provisional governments after the Carnation Revolution.

Famed novelist and diplomat Eça de Queiroz was buried at Alto de São João Cemetery prior to his reinterment in his family mausoleum in Baião Municipality.

Gallery

Notable burials or cremations 

 Adelaide Cabete (1867–1935), physician, teacher and feminist activist
 Adelina Abranches (1866–1945), theater actress
 Adelino da Palma Carlos (1905–1992), 102nd Prime Minister of Portugal
 Agostinho da Silva (1906–1994), philosopher, essayist and writer
 Alfredo Luís da Costa (1883–1908), perpetrator of the Lisbon Regicide
 Álvaro Cunhal (1913–2005), politician, writer and anti-fascist activist
 Alves dos Reis (1886–1955), entrepreneur
 Ana de Castro Osório (1872–1935), physician, teacher, writer, journalist and feminist activist
 António Botto (1897–1959), poet
 António Champalimaud (1918–2004), banker and industrialist
 António da Silva Porto (1850–1893), painter
 António de Almeida Santos (1926–2016), lawyer, politician and government minister
 António de Spínola (1910–1996), 14th President of Portugal
 António Granjo (1881–1921), lawyer and politician
 António José de Almeida (1866–1929), 6th President of Portugal
 António Machado Santos (1875–1921), Navy officer and politician
 António Maria Lisboa (1928–1953), poet
 Ary dos Santos (1936–1984), poet
 Bana (1932–2013), cape verdean singer
 Eduarda Lapa (1895–1976), painter
 Emília das Neves (1820–1883), theater actress
 Ernesto Hintze Ribeiro (1850–1907), 43rd, 45th and 47th Prime Minister of Portugal
 Fernando Chalana (1959–2022), football player and manager
 Filinto Elísio (1734–1819), poet
 Francisco da Costa Gomes (1914–2001), 15th President of Portugal
 Helena Vaz da Silva (1939–2002), journalist
 João Vaz (1859–1931), painter
 John Smith Athelstane (1816–1883), writer and diplomat
 Jorge Sampaio (1939–2021), 18th President of Portugal
 José Mário Branco (1942–2019), singer, songwriter and composer
 José Pinheiro de Azevedo (1917–1983), 104th Prime Minister of Portugal
 José Rodrigues (1828–1887), painter
 José Rodrigues Miguéis (1901–1980), writer
 José Saramago (1922–2010), Nobel winning writer
 José Vicente Barbosa du Bocage (1823–1907), zoologist and politician
 Manuel Buíça (1876–1908), perpetrator of the Lisbon Regicide
 Manuel Gomes da Costa (1863–1929), 10th President of Portugal
 Maria Clara Correia Alves (1869–1948), writer, journalist, teacher and feminist activist
 Maria João Abreu (1964–2021), actress
 Maria Matos (1886–1952), actress and stage director
 Maria Severa (1820–1846), Fado singer and guitarist
 Maria Veleda (1871–1955), journalist, teacher and feminist activist
 Miguel Bombarda (1851–1910), physician, psychiatrist and politician
 Nicolau Breyner (1940–2016), actor, stage director and playwright
 Palmira Bastos (1875–1967), actress and stage director
 Stella Piteira Santos (1917–2009), anti-fascist activist
 Vasco Gonçalves (1921–2005), 103rd Prime Minister of Portugal

References

External links 

 
Cemeteries in Portugal
Buildings and structures in Lisbon
Tourist attractions in Lisbon